Germany competed at the 2022 Winter Olympics in Beijing, China, from 4 to 20 February 2022.

Bobsledder Francesco Friedrich and speed skater Claudia Pechstein were the country's flagbearers during the opening ceremony. Meanwhile bobsledder Thorsten Margis was the country's flagbearer during the closing ceremony.

Germany finished in the second place at these Olympics. Overall, the nation won 12 gold and 27 total medals which is slightly lower than 14 gold and 31 overall in 2018.

Medalists

The following German competitors won medals at the games. In the discipline sections below, the medalists' names are bolded.

Competitors
The following is the list of number of competitors participating at the Games per sport/discipline.

Alpine skiing

By meeting the basic qualification standards, Germany has qualified at least one male and one female alpine skier.

DOSB announced the 7 men and 3 women participating on 19 January 2022.

Men

Women

Mixed

Biathlon

Based on their Nations Cup rankings in the 2020–21 Biathlon World Cup and 2021–22 Biathlon World Cup, Germany has qualified a team of 6 men and 5 women.

DOSB announced the 6 men and 5 women participating on 19 January 2022.

Men

Women

Mixed

Bobsleigh 

Based on their rankings in the 2021–22 Bobsleigh World Cup, Germany qualified 11 sleds. DOSB announced the competing athletes on 19 January 2022.

Men

Women

Cross-country skiing

By meeting the basic qualification standards, Germany has qualified at least one male and one female cross-country skier.

DOSB announced the 6 men and 8 women participating on 23 January 2017.

Distance
Men

Women

Sprint

Figure skating

Germany qualified one ladies', one pairs, and one ice dance entry, based on its placement at the 2021 World Figure Skating Championships in Stockholm, Sweden.

Team trophy

Freestyle skiing

DOSB announced the 4 men and 5 women competing on 19 January 2022.

Aerials
Women

Freeski
Women

Ski cross

Ice hockey

Summary
Key:
 OT – Overtime
 GWS – Match decided by penalty-shootout

Germany has qualified 25 male competitors to the ice hockey tournament.

Men's tournament

Germany men's national ice hockey team qualified by being ranked 7th in the 2019 IIHF World Rankings.

Team roster

Group play

Playoffs

Luge 

Based on their rankings in the 2021–22 Luge World Cup, Germany qualified ten athletes and a relay team. The team consists of three athletes each in the individual events and two doubles sleds. The team was officially named on 11 January 2022.

Men

Women

Mixed team relay

Nordic combined

DOSB announced the 5 athletes participating on 19 January 2018. Manuel Faißt was nominated after Frenzel and Weber were tested positive for COVID-19.

Short track speed skating

Germany has qualified two female short track speed skaters.

On 19 January 2022, DOSB announced that they will only use one female quota and nominated Anna Seidel.

Skeleton 

Based on the world rankings, Germany qualified 6 sleds.

On 19 January 2022, DOSB announced the 6 competing athletes.

Ski jumping

DOSB announced 3 men and 4 women participating on 19 January 2022. Two more men will be announced after 22 January 2022.

Men

Women

Mixed

Snowboarding

DOSB announced the 9 men and 6 women participating on 19 January 2022.

Freestyle

Parallel

Snowboard cross

Speed skating

DOSB announced the 3 men and 2 women participating on 11 January 2022.

Mass start

See also
Germany at the 2022 Winter Paralympics

References

Nations at the 2022 Winter Olympics
2022
Winter Olympics